Rhion is a monotypic genus of Asian cribellate araneomorph spiders in the family Dictynidae containing the single species, Rhion pallidum. It was first described by O. Pickard-Cambridge in 1871, and has only been found in Sri Lanka.

References

External links

Dictynidae
Endemic fauna of Sri Lanka
Spiders described in 1871
Spiders of Asia